Irada Pakka is a Marathi film released on 23 April 2010, produced by Smita Meghe and directed by Kedar Shinde.

Cast 
The cast includes
Siddharth Jadhav as Rohit
Sonalee Kulkarni as Adhya
Mohan Joshi as Adhya's father 
Smita Jaykar as Adhya's mother
Shalaka Pawar as Savitri
Sneha Raikar as Shalu vahini
Jayant Wadkar as Shalu's husband
Meenal Bal as Sameera
Kamlakar Satpute as Satyawan
Atul Todankar as Deepak
Nirmala Kotnis as Naina
Vijay Chavan as school principal

Soundtrack
The music is provided by Nilesh Mohrir, Pankaj and Pushkar Mahabal. It was launched at Ravindra Natya Mandir Dadar on 29 January 2010.
 The album contains six original and three remixed songs. Nilesh Mohrir composed the majority of the album and Pankaj Pushkar joined for title track.

References

External links 
 
 Movie review - mouthshut.com
 Article - afaqs.com

2010 films
2010s Marathi-language films